Ghana Senior High School (Ghanasco) is a co-educational second cycle institution located in Tamale, Northern Region of Ghana.

History 
Originally called Ghana College, the school was established in 1960 by the Government of Ghana, under Kwame Nkrumah, as one of the Ghana Education Trust Schools. It has a student population of about 2,800, and is the second largest school in the region after Tamale Senior High School (Tamasco). The first headmaster of the school was Kenneth Luther Purser, a Jamaican.  Master Abu Kassim Tahidu from Kwame Danso in the Brong Ahafo region of Ghana was the first senior prefect.

Key areas 
The administration block, the old dining hall, the new larger dining hall/ jams hall, the arts/ PTA block, the science block, the science laboratories including home  economics laboratory, the mosque, Nkrumah house, Gbewaa house, Cabral/Gbanzaba house, Dakpema and purser house are boys dormitories. The girls dormitories include; indice 1, indice 2 house, annex 1, annex 2 house and Lordina house, the headmaster's bungalow and the teachers' bungalows. The Ghanasco dam is used by surrounding communities including Kukuo and students of Ghana Senior High School.

Courses Offered 
The institution provides five main academic programs.

 General Arts
 General science
 Business 
 Home economics 
 Agricultural science

Achievements 
In 2019, the school beat Armed Forces Senior High School and New Juaben Senior High School in the Ghana National Science and Maths Quiz, which qualified them to the quarter finals in 2019.

In June 1970, a historic feat was chalked by the school when Mr. Lalaji, a mathematics teacher and his science students invented a rocket.  On 22 June 1970, the rocket was launched in the school with the Minister of Education Mr. William Offori-Attah in attendance.

School Anthem 

Ghana Senior High, Tamale Anthem
 Rejoice my soul for being a GHANASCAN
The home of learning;

“Patience and good intention” is our motto.

We shall work for our mother school with good intention,

we are proud to be GHANASCANS. 2x

Great GHANASCO

The home of learning

Great GHANASCO;

The route to success

We deserve the glory;

We deserve the honour that we adore

thee our mother school

We deserve the glory

We deserve the honour that we adore

thee our mother great GHANASCO.

Rejoice my soul for being a GHANASCAN.

The home of learning;

“Patience and good intention”

is our motto
We shall work for our mother school with good intention;
We Are proud to be GHANASCANS

Former headmasters

Notable alumni 
See also, Category:Ghana Senior High School (Tamale) alumni
Abdulai Abanga
Joseph Bawa Akamba
Yakubu Alhassan
Alhassan Andani
Moses Asaga
Dr. Ibrahim Mohammed Awal
Hassan Ayariga
Mahama Ayariga
Kwame Ayew
 Nayon Bilijo
 Abdul-Samed Muhamed Gunu
John Jinapor
 John Dramani Mahama
Lordina Mahama
Ibrahim Murtala Mohammed
Abedi Pele
Alhassan Suhuyini
Prof Nafiu (Dean of Students- School of Allied Health Sciences, UDS)

See also 
List of senior high schools in Ghana

References

External links
Ghanasco facebook page

Educational institutions established in 1960
1960 establishments in Ghana
High schools in Ghana
Boarding schools in Ghana
Tamale, Ghana